Reginald FitzPiers (died 1286), also known as Reynold FitzPiers, Lord of Blenlevenny was a 13th-century English nobleman and Sheriff of Hampshire. He was the second son of Peter FitzHerbert and Alice de Warkworth, and following the death of his brother inherited the minor Marcher Lordship of Blaenllynfi from him.

Life 
FitzPiers was the second son of Peter FitzHerbert and Alice de Warkworth. He succeeded his brother Herbert FitzPiers upon Herbert's death in 1248. FitzPiers was ordered to march against the Welsh in 1258, and in 1260, was ordered to reside in those parts. During 1261, FitzPiers was made sheriff of Hampshire, and governor of Winchester Castle. In 1282, he participated in the campaign of King Edward I of England in Wales against Llywelyn ap Gruffudd. FitzPiers died in 1286.

Marriage and children
Fitzpiers first wife was Alice, daughter and heir of William de Standford, they had the following known children:
Alice FitzReginald
Lucia FitzReginald
Katherine FitzReginald, married John Picard of Stradewy, had issue.
John FitzReginald, a signatory of the Barons' Letter of 1301

After de Standford's death Fitzpier married Joan, daughter and coheir of William le Forz de Vivonia and Maud de Ferrers, they had the following known children:
Eleanor FitzReginald, married William Martyn of Barnstable, had issue.
Joan FitzReginald
Reginald FitzReginald
Peter FitzReginald
Matthew FitzReginald
William FitzReginald
Isobel FitzReginald
Beatrice FitzReginald

Citations

References

Year of birth unknown
1286 deaths
High Sheriffs of Hampshire